This is a list of monoliths organized according to the size of the largest block of stone on the site. A monolith is a large stone which has been used to build a structure or monument, either alone or together with other stones. In this list at least one colossal stone over ten tons has been moved to create the structure or monument.

In most cases ancient civilizations had little, if any, advanced technology that would help them move these monoliths. The most notable exception is that of the ancient Greeks and Romans, who had cranes and treadwheels to help lift colossal stones (see list of ancient Greek and Roman monoliths).

This article also includes a list of modern experimental archaeology efforts to move colossal stones using technologies available to the respective ancient civilizations.

Most of these weights are based on estimates by published scholars; however, there have been numerous false estimates of many of these stones presented as fact. To help recognize exaggerations, an introductory description shows how to calculate the weight of colossal stones from first principles.

Calculating the weight of monoliths 
In the cases of smaller monoliths it may be possible to weigh them. However, in most cases monoliths are too large or they may be part of an ancient structure so this method cannot be used. The weight of a stone can be calculated by multiplying its volume and density. Each of these presents challenges.

Volume 
To obtain accurate estimates, one needs to survey the monolith, including realistic and explicit assessment of the shapes of inaccessible portions, and then calculate the volume and estimate volumetric errors, which vary crudely as the cube of linear uncertainties.

Density 

The density of most stone is between 2 and 3 tons per cubic meter. Basalt weighs about 2.8 to 3.0 tons per cubic meter; granite averages about 2.75 metric tons per cubic meter; limestone, 2.7 metric tons per cubic meter; sandstone or marble, 2.5 tons per cubic meter. Some softer stones may be lighter than 2 tons per cubic meter; for example, volcanic tuff weighs about 1.9 tons per cubic meter. Since the density of most of these stones varies, it is necessary to know the source of the stone to obtain accurate measurements. Identifying the rock type alone is not sufficient, as this table illustrates:

Simply identifying the monolith as sandstone would allow a ± 15% uncertainty in the weight estimate.
In practice, one would measure the density of the monolith itself, and preferably document any variation in density within the monolith, as it may not be homogeneous. Non-destructive methods of density measurements are available (e.g., electron back-scatter); alternatively, the site may contain already-separated fragments of the monolith which can be used for laboratory measurements or on-site techniques. At the crudest, a weighing device and a bucket can obtain two significant figures for a density value.

Quarried monoliths 

This section lists monoliths that have been at least partially quarried but not moved.

Moved monoliths 

This section lists monoliths that have been quarried and moved.

Stećak tombstone monuments of Bosnia and Herzegovina.
Daorson, ancient Illyrian city near Stolac in Bosnia and Herzegovina, built around central acropolis and surrounded with Cyclopean walls made of large stone megaliths.
Colossal statue of Tlaloc, in Coatlinchan. Made of basalt, weighing 168 tons.
The Kerloas menhir, Brittany, France. Largest, 150 tons.
Pyramid of Khendjer at Saqqara, Egypt. 150-ton, one-piece quartzite burial chamber.
Tiwanaku, Bolivia. Several ashlars, 100 to 130 tons, were transported .
Sacsayhuamán, wall near Cusco, Peru. Largest stones over 125 tons.
Treasury of Atreus at Mycenae, Greece. Largest lintel stone, 120 tons.
The Pyramid of Amenemhet III, at Hawara, Egypt. 110-ton, one piece quartzite burial chamber.
Brownshill Dolmen, 100 metric tons.
Baths of Caracalla, Rome, Italy. Granite columns close to 100 tons.
Fortress of Mycenae, Greece. Largest stones close to 100 tons.
Menhir de Champ-Dolent, Brittany, France. Menhir of about 100 tons.
Pyramid of Nyuserre Ini. 12 megalithic limestone beams 10 meters long weighing 90 tons each, forming the roof of burial chamber and antechamber.
Moai at Easter Island. Largest moai 70 to 86 tons. The tallest one, Paro, was moved .
Great Pyramid of Giza, Egypt. Largest slabs on burial chamber, 80 tons. The granite was transported  from Aswan by barge on the Nile river.
Karnak, Egypt. Obelisk, 328 tons. Largest architraves, 70 tons. Sandstone transported from Gebel Silsila .
Trajan's Column, Rome, Italy. Pedestal blocks: 77 t
Ishibutai Kofun in Asuka, Nara, Japan. Largest stone, 75 tons.
Pantheon, Rome, Italy. Granite columns, 39 feet (11.8 m) tall, five feet (1.5 m) in diameter, and 60 tons in weight were transported from Egypt by barge.
Olmec heads, Mexico, gulf coast. Largest Olmec head, almost 50 tons.
Ħaġar Qim, one of the Megalithic Temples of Malta. The Maltese temples are the oldest free-standing structures on Earth.
Ashoka Pillars, weighing up to about 50 tons, were transported throughout India to territory ruled by Ashoka.
Göbekli Tepe, Turkey. Megaliths from 10 to a 50-ton pillar still in its quarry transported up to a 1/4 mile.
Stonehenge, England. Largest stones over 40 tons were moved ; smaller bluestones up to 5 tons were moved .
Trajan's column Rome, Italy. Forty-ton drums. The capital block of Trajan's Column weighs 53.3 tons.
Some of these weighed over 40 tons.
Dur-Sharrukin, Iraq. Largest colossal bull, 40 tons.
Nineveh, Iraq. Largest colossal bulls, 30 tons each, were transported 30 miles (48 km) from quarries at Balatai, then lifted 65 feet (20 m) once they arrived at the site.
Nimrud, Iraq. Largest colossal bull, 30 tons.
Maeshowe Orkney Islands, Scotland. Largest flagstone, 30 tons.
Caesarea Maritima, harbor of Caesarea, Israel. Largest stone 20 tons.
Teotihuacan, Mexico. 22-ton water deity on top of the Pyramid of the Moon.
Aztec calendar stone at Tenochtitlan, Mexico. 24 tons.
Palenque, Mexico. The largest stones weigh 12 to 15 tons.
The Parthenon in Athens, Greece. Largest stones 10 tons.
Nubian pyramids. Sarcophagus, weighing 15.5 tons, and heavier granite statues up to at least 18 feet tall.
Angkor Wat, Angkor Thom and other Angkor temples, Cambodia. Five million tons of sandstone were transported  along the river for Angkor Wat.
Newgrange, Ireland. Built in 3200 BC.
Huge blocks, some weighing over 100 tons, at the Valley Temple.
45 Degrees, 90 Degrees, 180 Degrees at Rice University.
Several monuments were moved to higher positions from Hasankeyf, Turkey, due to the flood caused by the completion of the Ilisu Dam.
Hagia Sophia in Istanbul, Turkey. Columns close to, if not more than, 100 tons.

Lifted monoliths 

This section includes monoliths that were quarried, moved and lifted.

Erected in upright position 
Monoliths known to have been lifted into an upright position:

Lifted clear off the ground 
Monoliths that have been placed on a towering structure:

Monoliths known or assumed to have been lifted clear off the ground by cranes into their position:

Roman column monuments like Trajan's Column, though not often themselves monolithic, were built using very large sculpted stone blocks, stacked atop one another using cranes and lewises. The capital block of the column was usually even larger and heavier than the column drums. The columns of Marcus Aurelius, Antoninus Pius, and Constantine, and the lost columns of Theodosius, Arcadius, and Leo were all constructed in this way, on monumental pedestals and crowned with colossal statues. A few were monoliths, including the Column of Diocletian in Alexandria, called "Pompey's Pillar", the "Column of the Goths" and the Column of Marcian in Constantinople, and the lost Column of Antoninus Pius in Rome.

List of efforts to move and install stones 

These are listed with the largest experiments first; for additional details of most experiments see related pages.

Marinos Carburis, a Greek lieutenant-colonel in the Russian Army, organized the move of an enormous boulder called the Thunder Stone (Russian, Гром-Камень) from the Gulf of Finland in 1768 to Saint Petersburg, Russia for the purpose of using it as a pedestal for the Bronze Horseman statue. The mass of the Thunder Stone has been estimated to be around 1500 tons. This was done by rolling it on bronze ball bearings on a track. It took an estimated 400 men nine months to move it.
In 1997, Julian Richards teamed up with Mark Witby and Roger Hopkins to conduct several experiments to replicate the construction at Stonehenge for NOVA's Secrets of Lost Empires mini-series. They initially failed to tow a 40-ton monolith with 130 men but after adding additional men towing as well as some men using levers to prod the megalith forward, they succeeded in inching it forward a small distance.
Roger Hopkins and Mark Lehner teamed up with a NOVA crew to conduct an obelisk-erecting experiment; they successfully erected a 25-ton obelisk in 1999. They also managed to tow it a short distance.
Thor Heyerdahl organized an effort to pull a 10-ton moai on a sledge with a group of 180 men. This effort used 18 men per ton.
Charles Love experimented with a 10-ton replica of a Moai on Easter Island. His first experiment found rocking the statue to walk it was too unstable over more than a few hundred yards. He then found that by placing the statue upright on two sled runners atop log rollers, 25 men were able to move the statue  in two minutes. This effort used 2.5 men per ton.
Austen Henry Layard organized an effort to transport two 10-ton colossal statues of a winged lion and a winged bull with a group of 300 men in 1847. He loaded them on a wheeled cart and towed them from Nimrud to the river and loaded on a barge, where it was sent to London. This effort used 30 men per ton.
Paul Emile Botta and Victor Place attempted to move two additional 30-ton colossi to Paris from Khorsabad in 1853. To facilitate their shipment to Paris, they were sawn in pieces, but were still too heavy for the methods employed. One of the pieces fell into the Tigris River, never to be retrieved. The other made it to Paris.
Giovanni Battista Belzoni organized an effort to pull a 7.5-ton fragment of a statue of Ramses on rollers with a group of 130 men in 1815. This statue was towed to the river and loaded on a barge, where it was sent to London. Progress increased with practice as they went along. This effort used 17 or 18 men per ton.
Henri Chevrier organized an effort to pull a 6-ton block on a sledge with a group of six men. This effort used 1 man per ton. Other reports claim that Chevier's experiment required 3 men per ton.
Josh Bernstein and Julian Richards organized an effort to pull a 2-ton stone on wooden tracks with a group of about 16 men. This effort used 8 men per ton.
Mark Lehner and NOVA organized an experiment to tow stones and to build a pyramid 9 meters wide by 9 meters deep by 6 meters high. They were able to tow a 2-ton block on a sledge across wood tracks with 12 to 20 men. This effort used 6 to 10 men per ton. The pyramid was 54 cubic meters total estimated weight 135 tons. It was built out of 186 stones. The average weight of each stone was almost  (.75 tons). They found that four or five men could use levers to flip stones less than a ton and roll them to transport them. 44 men took 22 days to complete the pyramid, including the carving of the stones. However, they used iron to carve the stones, which was not widely used in Ancient Egypt; copper was typically used. They also used a modern front end loader to accelerate the work on the lower courses.
In a 2001 exercise, an attempt was made to transport a large stone along a land and sea route from Wales to Stonehenge. Volunteers pulled it for some miles (with great difficulty) on a wooden sledge over land, using modern roads and low-friction netting to assist sliding, but once transferred to a replica prehistoric boat, the stone sank in Milford Haven before it even reached the rough seas of the Bristol Channel.
Roger Hopkins and Vince Lee both theorized about how the megalithic stones were moved at Baalbek; these theories involved either towing them or flipping them.
Vince Lee participated in experiments to test his theories about how the walls of Sacsayhuamán were built.

See also 
 List of colossal sculpture in situ
 List of megaliths
 Rock-cut architecture

References

Sources 

Monoliths

Monoliths
Monoliths
Monolith